The 1945 San Francisco State Gatorsfootball team represented San Francisco State College—now known as San Francisco State University—as an independent during the 1945 college football season. San Francisco State did not field a team in 1943 or 1944. During this first post-World War II season, the team played a limited schedule. They was led by sixth-year head coach Dan Farmer, who had who had served as co-head coach from 1935 to 1938 and took over the team midway during the 1942 season. San Francisco State played home games at a field on campus in San Francisco, California, which was later named Cox Stadium. A search of newspapers from 1945 only finds the results for two games, although it is likely the team played more than that. In those two games, the Gators had a record 0–2 and were outscored by their opponents 64 to 0.

Schedule

References

San Francisco State
San Francisco State Gators football seasons
College football winless seasons
San Francisco State Gators football